Spotted dick (also known as spotted dog or railway cake) is a traditional British steamed pudding, historically made with suet and dried fruit (usually currants or raisins) and often served with custard. 

Non-traditional variants include recipes that replace suet with other fats (such as butter), or that include eggs to make something similar to a sponge pudding or cake.

Etymology
"Spotted" is a reference to the dried fruit in the pudding (which resemble spots). "Dick" and "dog" were dialectal terms widely used for pudding, from the same etymology as "dough" (i.e., the modern equivalent name would be "spotted pudding"). In late 19th century Huddersfield, for instance, a glossary of local terms described: "Dick, plain pudding. If with treacle sauce, treacle dick."

History

The dish is first attested in Alexis Soyer's The modern Housewife or ménagère, published in 1849, in which he described a recipe for "Plum Bolster, or Spotted DickRoll out two pounds of paste ... have some Smyrna raisins well washed".

The name "spotted dog" first appeared in 1855, in C.M. Smith's "Working-men's Way in the World" where it was described as a "very marly species of plum-pudding". This name, along with "railway cake", is most common in Ireland where it is made more similar to a soda bread loaf with the addition of currants.

The Pall Mall Gazette reported in 1892 that "the Kilburn Sisters ... daily satisfied hundreds of dockers with soup and Spotted Dick".

The name has long been a source of amusement and double entendres; reportedly restaurant staff in the Houses of Parliament decided to rename it "Spotted Richard" so it was “less likely to cause a stir”.

See also
 Clootie dumpling, a similar Scottish Traditional Pudding
 Figgy duff, a bag pudding from Newfoundland
 Poutchine au sac, Métis bag pudding from Western Canada
 List of fruit dishes
 List of steamed foods

References

Bibliography

External links
 Alexis Soyer's original 1849 recipe for Spotted Dick

British puddings
English cuisine
Custard desserts
Steamed foods
Fruit dishes